Xin Minhong (born May 17, 1979 in Dalian, Liaoning) is a female Chinese softball player. She was part of the fourth place team at the 2006 World Championship.

She also competed for Team China at the 2008 Summer Olympics in Beijing.

References
Profile

1979 births
Living people
Chinese softball players
Olympic softball players of China
Sportspeople from Dalian
Softball players at the 2004 Summer Olympics
Softball players at the 2008 Summer Olympics
Asian Games medalists in softball
Softball players at the 2006 Asian Games
Softball players at the 2002 Asian Games
Medalists at the 2002 Asian Games
Medalists at the 2006 Asian Games
Asian Games silver medalists for China
Asian Games bronze medalists for China